Rempah udang is a traditional Peranakan dumpling dessert snack (kueh or kuih), usually made from glutinous rice and shrimp paste (hae bee hiam) wrapped in a pandan leaf. It is sometimes wrapped in banana leaves.

Description 
Rempah udang typically comes as an oblong-shaped glutinous rice roll, filled in the middle with shrimp paste. The rice used is mixed with coconut milk and is sometimes coloured with the blue pea flower. It is similar to the Indonesian lemper.

References

Malaysian desserts
Rice dishes